Pilot Peak may refer to:

 Pilot Peak (Alaska) in Alaska, United States 
 Pilot Peak (Mariposa County, California) in Mariposa County, California, United States 
 Pilot Peak (Nevada County, California) in Nevada County, California, United States 
 Pilot Peak (Plumas County, California) in Plumas County, California, United States 
 Pilot Peak (San Bernardino County, California) in San Bernardino County, California, United States 
 Pilot Peak (Tuolumne County, California) in Tuolumne County, California, United States 
 Pilot Peak (Trinity County, California) in Trinity County, California, United States 
 Pilot Peak (Colorado) in Colorado, United States 
 Pilot Peak (Boise County, Idaho) in Boise County, Idaho, United States 
 Pilot Peak (Valley County, Idaho) in Valley County, Idaho, United States 
 Pilot Peak (Montana) in Montana, United States 
 Pilot Peak (Nevada) in Nevada, United States
 Pilot Peak (Utah) in Utah, United States 
 Pilot Peak (Wyoming) in Wyoming, United States

See also 
 Pilot Butte (disambiguation)
 Pilot Hill (disambiguation)
 Pilot Knob (disambiguation)
 Pilot Mountain (disambiguation)